Leslie Bourgouin, better known by her mononym Leslie, is a French pop-R&B singer born on 4 February 1985 in Le Mans, France. Her father is Vietnamese and Polynesian while her mother is French. She is married to French music producer Djamel Ferazi known as Kore, with whom she has a son.

In 2007, she recorded a duet single with the R&B singer Bobby Valentino, "Accorde-moi".

The same year, she covered several 1980s songs on her album Futur 80, including "Boule de flipper" originally sung by Corynne Charby, "Mise au point" by Jakie Quartz and "Les Bêtises" by Sabine Paturel.

Discography

Albums

Album appearances
 2004: Raï'n'B Fever
 2006: Raï'n'B Fever 2
 2008: Raï'n'B Fever 3

Singles

Featured singles

*Did not appear in the official Belgian Ultratop 50 charts, but rather in the bubbling under Ultratip charts.

Notes and references

External links
Official MySpace

21st-century French singers
1985 births
Living people
French people of Vietnamese descent
21st-century French women singers